Raglan Barracks was a military installation at Devonport.

History

The barracks were designed by Captain Francis Fowke to accommodate two entire regiments in transit for operations overseas and were built between 1853 and 1856. Named after FitzRoy Somerset, 1st Baron Raglan, the barracks were built in the colonial style with flat roofs and verandas. The site, which had a huge parade ground, was first occupied by the 96th Regiment of Foot in December 1858.

The Prince of Wales presented new colours to the 2nd Battalion The Duke of Cornwall's Light Infantry at the barracks in November 1887 and the Duke of Cambridge presented colours to the 2nd Battalion, The Somerset Light Infantry there in May 1895.

The barracks were demolished in the early 1970s. The main gateway, which survives, is a Grade II listed building.

References

Barracks in England
Installations of the British Army